Thirkleby may refer to:
Thirkleby High and Low with Osgodby, a civil parish in Hambleton District, North Yorkshire, England, which includes the villages of Great Thirkleby and Little Thirkleby
Thirkleby, Kirby Grindalythe, a hamlet in the parish of Kirby Grindalythe, Ryedale District, North Yorkshire, from which Roger of Thirkleby's name was derived.

See also
Thirkleby Hall, a demolished 18th-century house in Great Thirkleby